Venkatesh Kumar. G (born 25 June 1981) is an Indian Film director and screenwriter working in Tamil cinema. His first project was the short film "White Dirt". He made his debut in the Tamil film industry I 2012 with his film Neelam, which is based on the Rise of Rebel Groups in Sri Lanka. In 2016 he Produced and Directed a Tamil feature film Unakkul Naan which was premiered in Norway and was released worldwide in April 2016. In 2017 he has come up with his second feature film Lightman. His Film The Beautiful Eye explored the world of the visually challenged.He is the first Tamil citizen to represent Tamil Nadu to the birthplace of Leo Tolstoy at Yasnaya Polyana,Russia and present a Tamil book written by his great-grandfather. Currently he is under massive controversy for making a biography movie that is trying to make the late mass-murder and leader of Tamil Tigers, Velupille Prabhakaran a hero. He was awarded 'Honorary Diploma' by the Russian Federal Agency Rossotrudnichestvo in 2021 for his active role in International Cultural and Humanitarian development.

Background
Venkatesh Kumar. G was born on 25 June 1981 to Advocate Govindaswaminathan and G. Mallika at Cuddalore, Tamil Nadu. He later moved to Chennai and graduated from SRM College of Physiotherapy. While struggling as a director, he worked in many call centres, and simultaneously made his short films.  Though he is a physio, his passion was in film making and he hardly practised his profession and got into film making and has directed ten short films, six documentaries and 3 feature films so far. All his Short Works were Screened at the famous VGIK in 2013 during his visit to Moscow under the program of Russian Federation "Generation Next". He was the only Tamil Delegate to be a part of the 8 member Indian Delegation. He is the winner of two Indo-Russian Awards. He made his debut into Tamil film industry with Unakkul Naan In 2016 the Film "Unakkul Naan" was premiered at Norway and was released worldwide in April 2016 and received mixed reviews and critics for the film. His second film, Lightman, highlighted the plight of the downtrodden "Lightmen". His Recent Film The Beautiful Eye explored the world of visually challenged and was released on the "World Sight Day" 2017 Worldwide. He is currently directing a Biopic on Tamil Leader Velupillai Prabhakaran and it is titled சீறும் புலிகள் the raging tigers and scheduled to release in 2019. He was invited by the Leo Tolstoy estate museum at yasnaya polyana in September 2019 to present a Tamil book "Kadhaimanikkovai" which was written by his great-grandfather Rao.Sahib K.Kothandapani Pillai in 1932. The book carried three short stories of leo tolstoy translated in Tamil it was a text book for Tamil school students from 1930 to 1950 and the first of its kind in Tamil language. Mr. Kothandapani Pillai served as the deputy collector and controller of Emigration Madras till Indian republic. Mr Kumar delivered a speech on the topic leo tolstoy influence on Tamil literature at yasnaya polyana He was invited as a Guest Speaker to participate in the 100th anniversary celebrations of Leo Tolstoy estate museum at yasnaya polyana from Tamil Nadu in 2021. He was awarded the "Honorary Diploma" by Russian Federal Agency Rossotrudnichestvo For active work on the development of international humanitarian and public relations, exemplary organization, preparation and holding of significant events in the field of culture and education, popularization of the Russian language in December 2021.

Filmography

As director

Feature films

Unakkul Naan
Lightman
Neelam
சீறும் புலிகள் The Raging Tigers
A Home Away from Home

Short films

Crossword
Vidiyalai Thedi-In Search of Dawn
White Dirt
Dancing Neurons
Sadhai
Aridharam
Cinderella
Beg
Clown
New Life

Documentaries

Moths 'Vittil Poochigal'''HomeKannadi BommaigalFeedbackBeing FighterThe Beautiful Eye''

References

https://www.thehindu.com/features/cinema/cinema-columns/shotcuts-a-challenging-experience/article4869404.ece
https://www.thehindu.com/entertainment/movies/now-a-film-on-leo-tolstoy/article38292090.ece
https://www.thehindu.com/features/cinema/cinema-columns/etcetera-to-russia-with-love/article5104189.ece
https://www.thehindu.com/features/metroplus/etcetera-a-filmmakers-feedback/article5300541.ece
https://www.thehindu.com/features/cinema/short-in-the-arm/article7141204.ece
http://www.newindianexpress.com/entertainment/tamil/2017/jan/11/documenting-the-lives-of-light-men-1558266.html
https://deccanchronicle.com/entertainment/kollywood/080117/spotlight-on-light-men.html
http://www.deccanchronicle.com/entertainment/kollywood/270617/a-film-on-the-rise-of-rebel-groups.html
http://www.deccanchronicle.com/entertainment/kollywood/271017/film-neelam-denied-certification.html
http://www.sundaytimes.lk/article/1033756/indian-director-venkateshs-film-neelam-on-lankan-civil-war-denied-certification
http://www.newindianexpress.com/cities/chennai/2017/oct/28/tamil-film-on-sri-lankan-civil-war-denied-certification-1685292.html
http://www.thenewsminute.com/article/cbfc-denies-certification-trailer-tamil-film-sri-lankan-civil-war-70710
https://www.thequint.com/entertainment/indian-cinema/tamil-film-neelam-trailer-denied-cbfc-certificate
http://www.thehindu.com/news/national/tamil-nadu/neelam-director-goes-to-tribunal/article19973729.ece
http://www.newindianexpress.com/entertainment/tamil/2018/jan/29/i-know-who-runs-tamilrockers-lightman-director-g-venkatesh-kumar-1765264.html
https://newslk.ibctamil.com/ta/cinema/prabhakaran-life-story-film
http://pathivu.com/2018/04/blog-post_73.html
http://tamil.asianetnews.com/cinema/viduthalai-puligal-prabaharan-bio-graphy-moive
http://jvpnews.com/ltte/04/174535?ref=recommended1
http://cinemamurasam.com/archives/16527
https://semparuthi.com/160553
http://puthiyathalaimurai.com/news/tamilnadu/43049-prabakaran-life-history-has-been-taken-in-film.html
https://tamil.news18.com/news/entertainment/ltte-leader-prabhakaran-life-history-to-become-a-tamil-movie-13027.html
https://tamil.ucnews.in/news/திரைப்படமாகிறது-‘விடுதலை-புலிகள்-தலைவர்-பிரபாகரன்-வாழ்க்கை-வரலாறு/67000548231553.html
https://deccanchronicle.com/entertainment/kollywood/040418/biopic-on-velupillai-prabhakaran-on-anvil.html

https://dhinasari.com/cinema/33493-உருவாகிறது-பிரபாகரன்-வாழ.html
https://dailythanthi.com/Cinema/CinemaNews/2018/05/31010635/Prabhakaran-lives-in-life.vpf
https://scroll.in/reel/903880/a-leader-whose-story-needs-to-be-told-g-venkatesh-kumar-on-his-biopic-of-velupillai-prabhakaran
https://timesofindia.indiatimes.com/city/chennai/tolstoy-in-tamil-man-traces-literary-passion-of-great-grandfather/articleshow/69763242.cms
https://timesofindia.indiatimes.com/entertainment/tamil/movies/news/tamil-director-invited-by-leo-tolstoy-museum-in-russia/articleshow/71025997.cms
https://timesofindia.indiatimes.com/entertainment/tamil/movies/news/tamil-filmmaker-delivers-speech-on-tolstoy-in-russia/articleshow/71221250.cms
http://chennaipatrika.com/post/its-a-pleasure-to-inform-you-all-that-filmmaker-venkatesh-kumar-g-from-tamilnadu-has-been-invited-by-the-leo-tolstoy-estate-museum-at-yasnaya-polyana
https://thefederal.com/the-eighth-column/tamil-filmmaker-tolstoy-descendant-to-bring-russian-great-back-to-life/
https://www.cinemaexpress.com/tamil/news/2022/nov/10/nizhalgal-ravi-and-sriranjani-join-hands-for-a-home-away-from-home-36491.html

External links
Indiaglitz.com
Chennaionline.com
Moviegalleri.net
Indiancinemagallery.com
Movies.sulekha.com
Videos.behindwoods.com
Chennaionline.com

1981 births
Film directors from Chennai
Indian male screenwriters
Living people
Tamil screenwriters